The Silveirinha Formation is an Early Eocene (Ypresian, or MP7 or Neustrian in the ELMA classification) geologic formation of the Mondego Basin in the Região Centro of central-western Portugal. The sandstones, siltstones and conglomerates were deposited in an alluvial environment.

The formation has provided fossils of many mammals, birds, amphibians and reptiles, as well as mollusks and ostracods, and is considered one of the richest Early Eocene faunal assemblages of Europe. The taeniodont, typically known as a North American order; Eurodon silveirinhensis and the ostracod Cypris silveirinhaensis have been named after the formation.

Description 
The Silveirinha Formation, named after the Silveirinha clay pit,  crops out in the western part of the Mondego Basin in the Região Centro of central-western Portugal. The formation comprises fossiliferous lenticular calcitic conglomerates as well as laminated and cross bedded sands and brownish-red silts.

The conglomerates are interpreted as crevasse-splay deposit in a alluvial plain environment, which eventually flooded and where bogs and possibly oxbows developed, crossed by channels depending on a river system that drained higher areas more north or eastwards.

Climate 

The climate in the Early Eocene was substantially warmer than today.

Paleontological significance 
The Silveirinha clay pit after which the formation is named was first discovered in 1977 by Rui Pena dos Reis of Coimbra University. The unit is one of few earliest Eocene fossiliferous formations that provided a rich amphibian and reptile fauna. Most fossils were deposited in the channels after short transportation. Vegetation should have been rich in nearby areas, supporting a rich fauna. Ostracods,
gastropods, amphibians and pelomedusid chelonians indicate fresh waters, although rare bivalves show that salt or at least brackish waters were not very far away.

It is hypothesized that the species D. antunesi in the genus Diacodexis was more primitive than the earliest Wasatchian D. ilicis of North America, strongly supporting a Europe to America dispersal of this genus.

Fossil content 
The formation has provided the following fossils:

Mammals 
Primates
 Arcius zbyszewskii
 Donrussellia lusitanica

Acreodi
 Mondegodon eutrigonus

Artiodactyls
 Diacodexis antunesi

Carnivora
 cf. Miacis sp.
 Miacidae indet.

Cimolesta
 Ilerdoryctes cf. sigei

"Condylartha"
 Microhyus reisi

Ferae
 Dormaalocyon latouri
 cf. Viverravus sp.

Glires
 Euromys cardosoi
 Corbarimys paisi
 Microparamys cf. nanus

Hyaenodonta
 Didelphodus sp.

Insectivora
 Russellmys denisae
 Apatemys sp.
 Heterohyus sp.

Perissodactyls

 Paschatherium marianae
 Pliolophus vulpiceps
 Teilhardimys reisi
 cf. Lophiaspis maurettei

Taeniodonta
 Eurodon silveirinhensis

Theriiformes

 Archaeonycteris praecursor
 Leptacodon nascimentoi
 Peratherium cf. constans
 cf. Leptacodon sp.
 ?Talpavus sp.
 Creodonta indet.
 Nyctitheriidae indet.

Birds 
 Charadriiformes
 Recurvirostridae
 Fluviatilavis antunesi
 Ornithurae
 Neornithes indet.

Reptiles 
Crocodiles
 Diplocynodon sp.

Lizards

 Geiseltaliellus sp.
 cf. Melanosaurus sp.
 cf. Tinosaurus sp.
 Amphisbaenidae indet.
 Glyptosaurinae indet.
 Glyptosaurini indet.
 Gekkonidae indet.
 Iguanidae indet.
 Melanosaurini indet.
 Scincomorpha indet.
 ?Anguinae indet.
 ?Varanidae indet.

Snakes
 Dunnophis matronensis
 Boidae indet.

Turtles
 Neochelys sp.

Amphibians 
 Pelobatidae indet.
 Salamandridae indet.

Invertebrates 
Mollusks

 Bithynia soaresi
 Gyraulus antunesi
 Chlamys sp.
 Cardiacea indet.

Ostracods
 Cypris silveirinhaensis
 Ilyocypris lusitanicus
 ?Cyclocypris sp.

See also 

 List of fossiliferous stratigraphic units in Portugal
 Nanjemoy Formation, contemporaneous fossiliferous formation of the eastern United States
 Wasatch Formation, contemporaneous fossiliferous formation of the western United States
 Itaboraí Formation, contemporaneous fossiliferous formation of eastern Brazil

References

Bibliography 

 
 
 
 
 
 
 
 
  
 
 
 
  
 
 
 
 
 
 
 

Geologic formations of Portugal
Eocene Series of Europe
Paleogene Portugal
Ypresian Stage
Conglomerate formations
Sandstone formations
Siltstone formations
Alluvial deposits
Fossiliferous stratigraphic units of Europe
Paleontology in Portugal
Formations
Formations